Wellington C. Mepham High School is a public high school located on a  campus in North Bellmore, New York.  It is the oldest of three high schools in the Bellmore–Merrick Central High School District.  The school is known locally as "Mepham" (pronounced MEP-um), and was named in honor of the first school superintendent in the district.

As of the 2018–19 school year, the school had an enrollment of 1,241 students and 83.3 classroom teachers (on an FTE basis), for a student–teacher ratio of 14.9:1. There were 146 students (11.8% of enrollment) eligible for free lunch and 26 (2.1% of students) eligible for reduced-cost lunch.

2003 hazing sexual assault incident
In May 2003, it was reported that, while at a football training camp, at least three members of the football team were sexually assaulted by their teammates. Three members admitted to the acts, two of whom appeared in court. The sexual assault included anally penetrating the young men with foreign objects, including broom handles, pine cones, and golf balls. The team's season was canceled early, and two coaches were transferred to administrative positions.

Notable alumni
 
 
 
 
 
 
 Jon Gabrus – American actor and comedian
 
 
 Eric Chester, author, socialist political activist, and former economics professor

References

External links
 

public high schools in New York (state)
schools in Nassau County, New York